(Parliamentary) Committee on the Labour Market (AU) is a parliamentary committee in the Swedish Riksdag. The committee's areas of responsibility concern active labour market policies, working condition policies, working life policies, labour laws, along with gender equality between men and women on the labour market and the working life. The committee was first implemented into the Riksdag during the parliament year of 1975/1976, it served as a successor to the Committee on Home Affairs.

The Speaker for the committee is Magnus Persson from the Sweden Democrats and the vice-Speaker is Teresa Carvalho from the Social Democrats.

List of speakers for the committee

List of vice-speakers for the committee

See also 
 (Sweden's labour policies)

References

External links 
Riksdag - Arbetsmarknadsutskottet (Labour Market Committee)

Committees of the Riksdag